Juan-Pierre Francois Mostert (born 22 January 1988) is a former South African rugby union player that played first class rugby between 2011 and 2017.

Mostert was involved in a car accident in July 2017, resulting in a broken neck and paralysis.

References

External links

itsrugby.co.uk profile

Living people
1988 births
South African rugby union players
Rugby union flankers
Pumas (Currie Cup) players
Falcons (rugby union) players
Rugby union players from North West (South African province)